From 1364 to 1816 the region of Tur Abdin constituted a distinct patriarchate within the Syriac Orthodox Church, with the following patriarchs:

Ignatius Saba of Salah (1364–1389)
Ignatius Isho' of Midhyat (1389–1418), died 1421
Ignatius Mas'ud of Salah (1418–1420)
Ignatius Henoch of 'Ayn Ward (1421–1444)
Ignatius Qoma of Ba Sabrina (1444–1454)
Ignatius Isho' of Salah (1455–1460)
Ignatius 'Aziz (Philoxene) of Basila (1460–1482)
Ignatius Saba of Arbo (1482–1488)
Ignatius John Qofer of 'Ayn Ward (1489–1492)
Ignatius Mas'ud of Zaz (1492–1512)
Ignatius Isho' of Zaz (1515–1524)
Ignatius Simon of Hattakh (1524–1551)
Ignatius Jacob of Hisn (1551–1571)
Ignatius Sahdo of Midhyat (1584–1621)
Ignatius 'Abd Allah of Midhyat (1628–?)
Ignatius Habib of Midhyat (1674–1707)
Ignatius Denha of 'Arnas (1707–1725)
Ignatius Barsum of Midhyat (1740–1791)
Ignatius Aho and Ignatius Isaiah of Arbo (1791–1816), jointly

Between 1804 and c. 1840 there was a series of patriarchs of contested and limited authority:

Severus Isḥoq (1804–1816)
Yawsep of ʿArnas (1805–1834)
Barṣawmo of Ḥbob (1816–1839)
Mirza of Beth Sbirina (1816–1842)
Barṣawmo of Beth Sbirina (1821–1842)
Grigorios Zaytun Ghalma of Midyat (1821–1844)
Severus ʿAbd al-Nūr of Arbo (1834–1839)

See also
List of Syriac Orthodox Patriarchs of Antioch
List of Syriac Catholic Patriarchs of Antioch
Maphrian
Catholicose of the East

References

Religion-related lists
Lists of Oriental Orthodox Christians
Lists of patriarchs